Sibel Egemen (born 13 May 1958) is a Turkish singer.

Biography
She is the granddaughter of Turkish composer Muzaffer İlkar. Egemen got training as a child in ballet, violin and piano. She began her professional musical career in 1973 as member of Cici Kızlar. She left the group due to difficulty she felt running education and music together. After her break up, Bilgen Bengü joined them in 1975 and became one of the most popular singers in Turkey with a song called Hayret. With 1983's Dünyam Değişti, she branched off into folk music. After the last album, she left the music and began to Expert of Public Relations at Yurtbank between 1995 and 2005. She then moved to Izmir and has been academician at Public Relations and Advertising in Communication Faculty of Ege University since 2005.

Discography

Albums
1977 Sibel Egemen
1981 Sibel
1983 Dunyam Degisti
1988 Mini Minicik Bir Kase
1992 Dün ve Bugün... Sevgiyle

45's
1976 Simdi Ne Yapsam – Senin Vicdanın Yok Mu
1976 Yenildim Sana – Hayrola
1977 Hayret – Dile Benden Ne Dilersen
1977 Nerede – Sahte Gozyaslari

Filmography

References

External links
Official website
Last fm profile

1958 births
Living people
Musicians from Ankara
Turkish women singers
Turkish pop singers